Sun Hongyun (born 5 March 1962) is a Chinese fencer. She competed in the women's individual and team foil events at the 1988 Summer Olympics.

References

1962 births
Living people
Chinese female fencers
Olympic fencers of China
Fencers at the 1988 Summer Olympics
Asian Games medalists in fencing
Fencers at the 1990 Asian Games
Asian Games gold medalists for China
Medalists at the 1990 Asian Games
20th-century Chinese women